Erin is an unincorporated community in Jasper County, in the U.S. state of Texas.

History
A post office was established at Erin in 1847, and remained in operation until 1923. The community was perhaps named for Erin, a poetic name for Ireland. Erin was formerly a station on the Atchison, Topeka and Santa Fe Railway.

References

Unincorporated communities in Jasper County, Texas
Unincorporated communities in Texas